Hasanabad (also Romanized as Ḩasanābād) is a village in Kermajan Rural District, in the Central District of Kangavar County, Kermanshah Province, Iran. At the 2006 census, its population was 2,194, in 513 families.

References 

Populated places in Kangavar County